The protected areas of Finland include national parks, nature reserves and other areas, with a purpose of conserving areas of all of Finland's ecosystems and biotopes.

Protected areas include:
 National parks of Finland (Kansallispuisto/Nationalpark) - 8,170 km²
 Strict nature reserves of Finland (Luonnonpuisto/Naturreservat) - 1,530 km²
 Mire reserves of Finland (Soidensuojelualue/Myrskyddsområde) - 4,490 km²
 Protected herb-rich forest areas  (Lehtojensuojelualue/Lundskyddsområde) - 13 km²
 Protected old-growth forest areas (Vanhat metsät/Gamla skogar) - 100 km²
 Grey seal protection areas (Hylkeidensuojelualue/Sälskyddsområde) - 190 km²
 Other protected areas on state-owned land - 468 km²

The state-owned protected areas cover a total of 14,961 km² while 1,220 km² are on private land.

See also 
 Wilderness reserves of Finland
 Right of public access to the wilderness
 Natura 2000

External links 
 Finland's National Parks
 National parks, hiking areas, wilderness areas